Lightnin' Crandall is a 1937 American Western film directed by Sam Newfield and written by Charles F. Royal. The film stars Bob Steele, Lois January, Charles King, Earl Dwire, Ernie Adams and Frank LaRue. The film was released on March 24, 1937, by Republic Pictures.

Cast
Bob Steele as Bob Crandall aka Lightnin' Crandall
Lois January as Sheila Shannon
Charles King as Carson Blaine 
Earl Dwire as Parson Durkin
Ernie Adams as Texas May
Frank LaRue as Wes Shannon
Horace Murphy as J. Travis
Lloyd Ingraham as Judge
Lew Meehan as Henchman Bull Prescott
Dave O'Brien as Tommy Shannon

References

External links
 

1937 films
American Western (genre) films
1937 Western (genre) films
Republic Pictures films
Films directed by Sam Newfield
American black-and-white films
1930s English-language films
1930s American films